Air Commodore Richard David Mason OBE is a Royal Air Force officer.

RAF career
Educated at King Edward's School, Birmingham, Mason was commissioned into the Royal Air Force on 4 July 1985. After taking part in Operation Barras in September 2000 and subsequently in the War in Afghanistan, he became Station Commander at RAF Benson in 2010 and Capability Director at Joint Helicopter Command in 2014.

He was appointed an Officer of the Order of the British Empire in the 2009 New Year Honours.

References

Officers of the Order of the British Empire
Living people
1966 births
Royal Air Force air commodores